Alfred Melvin Jackson, Jr. (born July 7, 1967) is a former professional American football wide receiver who played nine seasons in the Canadian Football League (CFL) for three teams. He also played six seasons in the National Football League (NFL) as a cornerback for three teams.

1967 births
Living people
People from Tulare, California
American football defensive backs
BC Lions players
Canadian football wide receivers
Cleveland Browns players
Los Angeles Rams players
Minnesota Vikings players
San Diego State Aztecs football players
Sportspeople from Tulare County, California
Toronto Argonauts players
Winnipeg Blue Bombers players
Players of American football from California
American football wide receivers